Stadium Tuško Polje is a football stadium in Tuzi, Podgorica, Montenegro. It is used for football matches and is the home ground of FK Dečić.

History
During the decades, at location Tuško Polje existed football pitch which didn't meet criteria for official games. So, FK Dečić, a football club from Tuzi, played their home games in Podgorica or Golubovci. But in 2006, a new stadium was built.
The first game played at Stadium Tuško Polje was played on 19 August 2006. At second week of the 2006-07 Montenegrin First League, FK Dečić hosted Montenegrin strongest side FK Budućnost (0-3) in front of 3,000 spectators. That was a record attendance at Stadium Tuško Polje.
The stadium was renovated several times, so today it has a capacity of 2,000 seats on two stands. Next phase of work will be the expansion of the western stand and after that, the capacity of the stadium will be 3,000 seats.

Attendances
Below is the list of attendances at FK Dečić home games on Tuško Polje by every single season.

Pitch and conditions
The pitch measures 110 x 70 meters. The stadium didn't met UEFA criteria for European competitions.
In addition to the main field is an auxiliary field with artificial grass that is used for competitions in the junior categories.

See also
FK Dečić
Tuzi
Podgorica

External links
 Stadium information (before expanding works)

References 

Football venues in Montenegro
Football in Montenegro
FK Dečić
Sport in Podgorica
Buildings and structures in Podgorica